Beachcomber (also known as Tai) is a small, private island within the Mamanuca Islands of Fiji in the South Pacific, which in turn are a part of Fiji's Western Division.

Geography
Beachcomber Island, also known as Tai, is one of the resort islands of Fiji, located about 18 km west of Lautoka, the second largest city of the state, located on the main island of Viti Levu. Beachcomber is also called barefoot island, as it is common on the island not to wear shoes.

The original name Tai was changed to Beachcomber Island in the 1960s, mainly to make the island more attractive to tourists. The island is mainly used for tourism, for water sports such as swimming, snorkeling, and diving as well as motor water sports such as jet skiing, water skiing, and motor boating.

The port is situated on the north side of the island.

See also

 List of islands

References

External links
Beachcomber Island Resort

Islands of Fiji
Mamanuca Islands